Marcella is an unincorporated community in Stone County, Arkansas, United States. Marcella has a post office with ZIP code 72555.

History
Marcella was called Wallace Creek back in the 1830s. At that time Stone county was part Izard county.

Note: Izard county, Arkansas Territory was established 27 Oct 1825 from Independence county, Arkansas Territory.

Note: Arkansas Territory was established 1828 from Missouri Territory and the Cherokee Nation Tract & Reservation land.

Note: Arkansas the 25th state was established 15 June 1836 from Arkansas Territory, including Oklahoma.
  
Note: Baxter county, Arkansas was established 24 March 1873 from Fulton, Izard, Searcy and Marion county's, Arkansas.
 
Note: Stone county, Arkansas was established 21 April 1873 from Izard, Searcy, Independence and Van Buren county's, Arkansas.

References

Unincorporated communities in Stone County, Arkansas
Unincorporated communities in Arkansas